Panair was an air taxi operator based in Palermo, Italy, founded in 1979 until 2003 operating with a Cessna Citation II, a Boeing 737-300 and a Boeing 737-400 which entered in service in 2001. In March 2003, both were withdrawn from use marking the end of Panair's flight operations.

Fleet

References

Italian companies established in 2001
Italian companies disestablished in 2003
Defunct airlines of Italy
Airlines established in 2001
Airlines disestablished in 2003